Club Green Streets is a professional football club based in Malé, Maldives that competes in the Dhivehi Premier League, the top flight of Maldivian football. The club was founded in 2010, starting in the third division, and earned promotion to the 2nd division as the runners up in 2012. They later earned promotion to the first division in 2016 after an unbeaten season. The club and its head coach Sobah Mohamed has mutually decided to continue their journey further by taking on the club's latest and biggest challenge since its inception.

The club was established in the hopes of uniting the youth of Machangolhi through the power of football. It is still the club's main goal to provide positions within the club to as many local youngsters and to promote and develop young talents while providing them a platform to showcase their abilities. Club Green Streets Academy will kick-off in 2017 as part of this objective, to scout for hidden talents and to develop and nurture these athletes for the betterment of the game and future of football in the country.

History 

Registered with only 70 members on the initial member list in 2010, Club Green Streets has enjoyed the privilege of increasing the size of the club in terms of membership, for the past six years. Today, with over 400 registered members, Club Green Streets is one of the strongest local clubs in the capital city of Maldives. Club Green Streets was registered as a recreational sports club for the youth of Machangolhi. The club participated in many other sports such as basketball, futsal and Baibalaa. One of the first titles the club won as a registered recreational sports club was the Under-18 baibalaa championship.

Honours

Football

 FAM Second Division
2013: 3rd Place
2015: Runners-up
2016: Champions

 FAM Third Division
2012: Runners-up

Baibalaa

U18 Baibalaa
Champions: 2010

Players

Current squad
Latest Squad

Coaching staff

Current coaches

Sponsorship

References

Association football clubs established in 2010
Football clubs in the Maldives
2010 establishments in the Maldives
Dhivehi Premier League clubs